David Mark Douglas Jeser (born September 25, 1977) is an American television writer and co-creator with Matt Silverstein of Drawn Together. He has also written for other television shows including 3rd Rock from the Sun, The Man Show, Action, Greg the Bunny, Axe Cop, The Goode Family and The Cleveland Show, and also created the MTV animated comedy DJ & the Fro in 2009.

Biography
Jeser was raised in a Jewish family in New Milford, New Jersey.  His parents were ardent Zionists. Jeser is a graduate of Solomon Schechter Day School of Bergen County in New Milford and the Dwight-Englewood School in Englewood, New Jersey where he met Silverstein. In 2015, Jeser, along with Matt Silverstein, developed author Joshua Miller's Golan the Insatiable for television appearing on Fox Television in May 2015. Producers were Jeser, Silverstein, Hend Baghdady and Nick Weidenfeld.

Filmography

Film

References

External links
 

1977 births
Living people
American television writers
American male television writers
Jewish American writers
People from New Milford, New Jersey
Dwight-Englewood School alumni
Screenwriters from New Jersey
21st-century American Jews